Diaries may refer to:

 the plural of diary
Diaries: 1971-1976, a 1981 documentary by Ed Pincus
Diaries 1969–1979: The Python Years, a 2006 book by Michael Palin
OFW Diaries, a public affairs television show in the Philippines

See also